Timo Bernhard (born 24 February 1981) is a former driver from Germany. He was a sports car driver from Porsche, but was seconded to Audi for selected events in 2009 and 2010. He is the ninth and most recent driver to complete the informal triple crown of endurance racing. On 29 June 2018, he became the first person in 35 years to break the all-time Nürburgring Nordschleife lap record, set by Stefan Bellof in 1983 with a Porsche 956, in a derestricted Porsche 919 Evo with a time of 5:19.546.

Early career
Bernhard was born in Homburg, Saarland. He debuted in karting in 1991. He finished 5th at the CIK/FIA Junior World Championship and was crowned German junior champion. The next two years, Bernhard was 6th and 3rd at the German Karting Championship. In 1998 he moved to formula cars as he joined Formula Ford, finishing 6th in both the German series and the Eurocup in 1998. In his last year in open-wheelers, 1999, Bernhard finished 3rd in the German Formula Ford.

Sports cars
For 2000, Bernhard drove in Porsche Supercup as a UPS Porsche Junior driver, finishing 3rd in the championship.  In 2001, he made his American Le Mans Series debut at the 12 Hours of Sebring, where he finished 2nd in the GT class with Randy Pobst and Christian Menzel, driving for Alex Job Racing.  He also made four other ALMS starts, and won the Porsche Carrera Cup championship.

2002
In 2002 he began the season with a class win in the 24 Hours of Daytona for The Racer's Group.  He then finished second overall at the 24 Hours Nürburgring driving for Alzen Motorsport.  The crowning achievement of the year was winning the GT class at the 24 Hours of Le Mans, with Kevin Buckler and Lucas Luhr.  He also finished 3rd in the Carrera Cup, and won his first ALMS race (with Jörg Bergmeister) and finished 4th in the championship.

2003
Bernhard began the season by winning the 24 Hours of Daytona outright in a Porsche 911 GT3-RS, driving with Buckler, Michael Schrom, and Bergmeister.  Bernhard and Bergmeister won 3 ALMS races, including Petit Le Mans, and finished second in the championship.  He also finished 3rd at the Nürburgring 24 Hours.

2004
In 2004, Bernhard again partnered with Jörg Bergmeister in the ALMS.  The duo took six wins from nine starts and won the GT class driver's championship.  Their successes included class wins at Sebring and Petit Le Mans, both time joined by Sascha Maassen.  Bernhard also finished 4th overall and 2nd in class in the Spa 24 Hours.  He finished on the podium at the Nürburgring 24 Hours for the 3rd straight year, finishing in third in a Manthey Racing Porsche.

2005
Bernhard joined Romain Dumas in the ALMS for 2005.  They scored four class wins, and Bernhard won four poles, but finished second in the championship.  Dumas also finished 2nd in the GT2 class at the 24 Hours of Le Mans, driving with Jörg Bergmeister and Patrick Long.

2006
In 2006, Bernhard moved to Penske Racing who owned and captained by legendary owner Roger Penske and the new Porsche RS Spyder in the LMP2 class of the ALMS, again partnering Dumas.  After a frustrating start to the season, Bernhard and Dumas took advantage of the Audi R10's absence from the series to take the overall win at Mid-Ohio. This was the first overall win for an LMP2 class car, and the first win for an under-class car since 2003. Bernhard also won the LMP2 class at Petit Le Mans (with Sascha Maassen and Emmanuel Collard), and took four class victories in total and finished 3rd in the championship. He also won the 24 Hours Nürburgring outright, partnering Lucas Luhr, Marcel Tiemann, and Mike Rockenfeller.

2009
Bernhard and Dumas moved to Joest Racing, in which he ran the new Audi R15 TDI. Along with Alexandre Prémat, the #3 car finished 17th in the 2009 24 Hours of Le Mans.

2010
Along with Dumas and Rockenfeller, Bernhard took the overall win in the 2010 24 Hours of Le Mans. Bernhard's victory made him the eleventh driver to complete the Triple Crown in endurance racing, with Bernhard also winning not only the 2003 24 Hours of Daytona but also the 2008 12 Hours of Sebring with Penske (also with Dumas but also with Collard). Bernhard partnered Klaus Graf in the Muscle Milk Team CytoSport Porsche RS Spyder to second place at Road America, the seventh round of the 2010 ALMS season.

Racing achievements

ALMS LMP2 class champion: 2007, 2008
ALMS GT class champion: 2004
24 Hours of Le Mans GT class winner: 2002
24 Hours of Le Mans Overall winner: 2010, 2017
12 Hours of Sebring GT class winner: 2004
12 Hours of Sebring Overall winner: 2008
Petit Le Mans LMP2 class winner: 2006
Petit Le Mans GT class winner: 2003, 2004
24 Hours of Daytona overall winner: 2003
24 Hours of Daytona GT class winner: 2002, 2003
24 Hours Nürburgring winner: 2006, 2007, 2008, 2009, 2011
Porsche Carrera Cup Germany champion: 2001

Racing record

Career summary

Complete 24 Hours of Le Mans results

Complete FIA World Endurance Championship results

* Season still in progress.
(key) (Races in bold indicate pole position) (Races in italics indicate fastest lap)

Complete WeatherTech SportsCar Championship results

References

External links
 
 

1981 births
Living people
People from Homburg, Saarland
Racing drivers from Saarland
German racing drivers
American Le Mans Series drivers
24 Hours of Le Mans drivers
24 Hours of Le Mans winning drivers
24 Hours of Daytona drivers
Rolex Sports Car Series drivers
FIA GT Championship drivers
Formula Ford drivers
European Le Mans Series drivers
Porsche Supercup drivers
FIA World Endurance Championship drivers
Blancpain Endurance Series drivers
WeatherTech SportsCar Championship drivers
24 Hours of Spa drivers
Sports car racing team owners
12 Hours of Sebring drivers
Team Penske drivers
Porsche Motorsports drivers
Audi Sport drivers
Team Joest drivers
Extreme Speed Motorsports drivers
Nürburgring 24 Hours drivers
KCMG drivers
Rowe Racing drivers
Phoenix Racing drivers
Porsche Carrera Cup Germany drivers